The 140 Squadron "Osprey" of the Republic of Singapore Air Force currently operates twelve F-16 Fighting Falcon of the F-16C/D Block 52 version. Based in Tengah Air Base, the squadron goes by the motto "Stand Firm in Defence" with the Osprey adopted as its mascot.

History
The Squadron was set up in September 1970 as Singapore's first Air Defence Fighter Squadron and received their first aircraft - twenty refurbished Hawker Hunters aircraft in July 1970. The Hawker Hunters served faithfully for twenty years, after which they were replaced by the F-16A/Bs in 1990. These were, in turn, replaced by newer F-16C/Ds in 2000 and were subsequently transferred to Royal Thai Air Force the same year.

The Squadron celebrated its 50th anniversary in 2020.

Information
The tail is adorned with a red checkered tailband. The squadron's logo is centered with the serial number on the base of the tail. This scheme was already applied during the F-16A/B era.

Achievements
140 Squadron is also a consistent winner in the annual Singapore Armed Forces Best Unit Competition for the Air Force, having emerged as the Best Fighter Squadron since the competition's inception back in 1985. Namely: 1985, 1987, 1991, 1992, 1993, 1994, 1996, 1999, 2003, 2006, 2007, 2009, 2016.

140 Squadron won the Best Squadron for the Hotshot Challenge 2016. It celebrated its 45th anniversary in 2015 and won the Best Fighter Squadron.

Aircraft operated
46× Hawker Hunters (1970–1992)
8× F-16A/B Fighting Falcons (1990–2004)
12× F-16C/D Fighting Falcons (2003–present)

Latest photo

References

External links
RSAF web page on 140 Sqn & Tengah Air Base (TAB)

Squadrons of the Republic of Singapore Air Force
Tengah